Andrey Lvovich Livadny (born May 27, 1969) is a Russian military science fiction writer. His works were first published in 1998 and include several novels as well as a number of tales and short stories. Most of his works are merged into The History of the Galaxy series, which embraces human development over the next 2,000 years. Many of Livadny's works, like "Dabog", are pierced by antiwar sentiments.

Livadny resides in Pskov.

Bibliography 
Burden of Warrior ("Бремя воина") 
The Lost One ("Потерянная")
City of Dead ("Город мëртвых")
Ambassador ("Посол")
Dark Side of the Earth ("Тëмная сторона Земли")
Decided Superiority ("Реальное превосходство")
Forced Landing ("Вынужденная посадка")
Black Oasis ("Чëрный oазис")
The Relic ("Реликт")
Cluster of Shiran ("Скопление Ширана")
The World On The Palm ("Мир на ладони")
Liben nicknamed Styx ("Лайбен по прозвищу Стикс")
NEBEL ("NEBEL")
The Ark ("Ковчег")
Ganymede Rising ("Восход Ганимеда")
Lifeform ("Форма жизни") series
Lifeform 
The Colony ("Колония") 
Master of the Night ("Владыка ночи") – prequel to "The Colony".
The Rebellious Procyon ("Мятежный Процион") 
Another Mind ("Иной разум") series
Platoon ("Взвод")
Adjacent Sector ("Смежный сектор")
Xenob-19 ("Ксеноб-19")

External links
Official site (English version)

Russian science fiction writers
1969 births
Living people